Itaplectops is a genus of tachinid flies in the family Tachinidae.

Species
I. akselpalolai Fleming & Wood, 2014
I. anikenpalolae Fleming & Wood, 2014
I. antennalis Townsend, 1927
I. argentifrons Fleming & Wood, 2014
I. aurifrons Fleming & Wood, 2014
I. ericpalolai Fleming & Wood, 2014
I. griseobasis, Wood et al. ,2015
I. omissus Fleming & Wood, 2014
I. shellymcsweeneyae Fleming & Wood, 2014
I. tristanpalolai Fleming & Wood, 2014

References

Diptera of South America
Diptera of North America
Dexiinae
Tachinidae genera
Taxa named by Charles Henry Tyler Townsend